The Johnny Warren Medal is awarded to the best player of the Australian national soccer club competition. It was first awarded in the National Soccer League in 1990, and upon the NSL's demise in November 2004, was carried forward into the new national club competition, the A-League. It is named after former Australia national soccer team captain and tireless promoter of soccer in Australia, Johnny Warren.

The medal was previously determined by the votes of current players after rounds 9, 18 and 27. The format was changed for the 2015-16 A-League season following consultation with all A-League clubs, the PFA and the Warren family.

For the 2015–16 A-League season to determine the medal a new four body panel was introduced that independently vote on a 3–2–1 basis after each regular season match, which is consolidated into a single 3–2–1 vote. The four body panel consists of:
 A technical football expert;
 A football media representative;
 A former professional player representative; and
 A combined vote from the match officials.
The eligible player(s) who receive the most votes for the regular season will determine the winner of the medal.

Since 2016 the award has been presented jointly with the Julie Dolan Medal at an event known as the Warren – Dolan Awards , where both A-League and W-League awards are presented.

Eligibility
A player is ineligible to win the medal if they are:
 suspended as a result of receiving a direct red card in a match;
 suspended as a result of a determination of a body under the Hyundai A-League Disciplinary Regulations;
 convicted of an anti-doping offence;
 found guilty of serious misconduct;
 a Guest Player; and/or
 found guilty of breaching an FFA Statute.

List of winners

NSL

A-League

Multiple winners
The following players have won the Johnny Warren Medal multiple times.

See also
 John Kosmina Medal
 Joe Marston Medal
 Mark Viduka Medal
Michael Cockerill Medal

References

External links
 Oz Football – NSL Individual Award Winners

National Soccer League (Australia)
Australian soccer trophies and awards
Awards established in 1990
1990 establishments in Australia
Annual events in Australia